Werner Nold  (born December 19, 1933, in Samedan, Switzerland) is a Quebec film editor. In 1984, he was named a Member of the Order of Canada, and 2012, he was named as a Knight of the National Order of Quebec. In 2010, he received the Prix Albert-Tessier from the government of Quebec for his contributions to the cinema of Quebec. Over a 35-year career at the National Film Board of Canada (NFB), Nold worked on approximately 100 films. He also co-founded the Conseil québécois pour la diffusion du cinéma and served as president of the Rendez-vous du cinéma québécois.

Born in Switzerland, Nold moved to Quebec in 1955, while in his early 20s. He was hired by the NFB in 1961, and retired from film editing in 1996, when back trouble made long hours of sitting too painful. He lives with his wife of over 40 years, Lucette Lupien, in Montreal's Habitat 67 complex.

References

External links

Filmography at the National Film Board of Canada

Canadian film editors
Members of the Order of Canada
National Film Board of Canada people
Francophone Quebec people
Swiss emigrants to Canada
1933 births
Living people
People from Maloja District
People from Montreal
Prix Albert-Tessier winners